Hata -e- Sheikhan is a sublocality of Dugawan in Lucknow, in the Indian state of Uttar Pradesh. It was established in the 19th century by Mehmud Ghaznavi.

Location 

It is located to the north of Charbagh Railway Station on Subash Marg and comes under Dugawan locality.

Education 

Hata -e- Sheikhan is home to Social Service Kanya Pathshala, which is a co-educational government school established in 1973.

References 

Neighbourhoods in Lucknow